George Michael James Giles (1853 - 1916) was an English surgeon and entomologist who specialised in mosquitoes.
He wrote A report of an investigation into the causes of the diseases known in Assam as KaÌ_la-AzaÌ_r and Beri-Beri (1890) and A handbook of the gnats or mosquitoes giving the anatomy and life history of the Culicidae, together with descriptions of all species notices up to the present date (1902).

Giles described several new species of mosquitoes. Two of the most important are Culex tritaeniorhynchus, described in 1901, and Anopheles culicifacies, described in 1901 with three other species.

References

 Evenhuis, N. L. 1997 Litteratura taxonomica dipterorum (1758-1930). Volume 1 (A-K); Volume 2 (L-Z). Leiden, Backhuys Publishers 1; 2 VII+1-426; 427-871

External links
 List of works on mosquitoes from the Walter Reed Unit
 Portrait

Dipterists
English entomologists
1853 births
1916 deaths